Guarea polymera is a species of plant in the family Meliaceae. It is found in Colombia and Ecuador.

References

polymera
Vulnerable plants
Taxonomy articles created by Polbot